Direct-acting antivirals (DAA) are drugs used to treat  hepatitis C infections. They are a combination of antiviral drugs that target stages of the hepatitis C virus reproductive cycle. They are more effective than older treatments such as ribavirin and interferon. The DAA drugs are taken orally, as tablets, for 8 to 12 weeks. The treatment depends on the type or types (genotypes) of hepatitis C virus that are causing the infection.  Both during and at the end of treatment, blood tests are used to monitor the effectiveness of the treatment and subsequent cure.

The DAA combination drugs used include:
 Harvoni (sofosbuvir and ledipasvir)
 Epclusa (sofosbuvir and velpatasvir)
 Vosevi (sofosbuvir, velpatasvir, and voxilaprevir)
 Zepatier (elbasvir and grazoprevir)
 Mavyret (glecaprevir and pibrentasvir)

DAAs were approved on the basis of a surrogate endpoint called "Sustained virological Response" or SVR. Although SVR is widely marketed as a functional "cure," its validity for predicting clinical outcomes (liver disease. extending life) has been challenged,

References 

Combination drugs
Anti–hepatitis C agents